Geoffrey William Humpage (born 24 April 1954 in Sparkbrook, Birmingham) is a former England cricketer who played in three One Day Internationals in 1981. Humpage played in county cricket as a hard-hitting middle-order batsman and wicketkeeper for Warwickshire from 1974 to 1990.

, he still holds the Warwickshire batting record for the fourth wicket: a stand of 470 with Alvin Kallicharran against Lancashire at Southport in 1982, of which Humpage contributed 254 (his highest first-class score), in a match which Warwickshire lost by ten wickets. As of 2022, this is the fourth highest fourth-wicket partnership in first-class cricket anywhere, and the highest ever in England. He went on the rebel tour to South Africa in 1981–82, which effectively ended his international career after just three ODIs, despite it having no similar effect on the international careers of other rebel tourists including Graham Gooch, John Emburey and Peter Willey. Humpage remains the only tourist on this tour who never played Test cricket. He was named one of the Wisden Cricketers of the Year in 1985.

An occasional bowler, while bowling in a John Player League match in 1980 he was credited with effecting an unusual run out (of Sussex's  Colin Wells) after a delivery hit back by the batsman deflected via Humpage's trouser leg onto the non-striker's stumps. In this year, Humpage helped his county win the John Player League, and he also helped them to win the NatWest Trophy in 1989.

On retirement Humpage become a policeman.  In 2001 he spoke out about possible match-fixing in the English game twenty years earlier, saying: "In one game we found ourselves up against a side who [were] suddenly playing kids in important positions. In the Sunday game it was a little bit easier than it should have been. Other people have now said that there are question marks over the two games".

References

1954 births
England One Day International cricketers
English cricketers
Warwickshire cricketers
Free State cricketers
Living people
Wisden Cricketers of the Year
Marylebone Cricket Club cricketers
Wicket-keepers